Gohourou Jean-Yves Anis (born 30 November 1980) is an Ivorian former professional footballer who previously played for Partick Thistle. He also holds French citizenship.

He began his career as a youth at Stade Rennais, before moving to English giants Chelsea in 2002. After a brief spell at Chelsea, Anis moved to Scottish Premier League side Partick Thistle in 2003, under the management of Gerry Collins.

After two seasons with the Maryhill side, Anis had brief spells at Ayr United and Clydebank, after which he became unattached.

References

External links
 Career summary by playerhistory.com

1980 births
Living people
People from Gôh-Djiboua District
Ivorian footballers
Ivorian emigrants to France
Naturalized citizens of France
French footballers
French expatriate footballers
French sportspeople of Ivorian descent
Expatriate footballers in Scotland
Scottish Premier League players
Scottish Football League players
Partick Thistle F.C. players
Ayr United F.C. players
Clydebank F.C. players
Association football defenders